Vecsaliena Parish is an administrative unit of Augšdaugava Municipality in the Selonia region of Latvia.

Towns, villages and settlements of Vecsaliena Parish 
 Červonka

 
Parishes of Latvia
Selonia